José Andrés Martínez Torres (born 7 August 1994) is a Venezuelan professional footballer who plays as a midfielder for Major League Soccer club Philadelphia Union and the Venezuela national team. Martínez has been referred to by the nickname "el Brujo" (Spanish for "the Wizard").

Club career

Zulia 
After two seasons with Deportivo JBL del Zulia, Martínez signed with Zulia FC ahead of the Apertura tournament in December 2017. While with Zulia, he earned the 2018 Copa Venezuela title and made a historic run in the Copa Sudamericana; advancing through to the quarter-finals.

Philadelphia Union 
In December 2019, Martínez signed a two-year contract with Philadelphia Union competing in Major League Soccer for a transfer fee reported around $325,000. Martínez made his debut start for the Union in a 3-3 draw at Los Angeles FC. During the 2020 season, Martinez grew praise for his quality of play as one of the best defensive midfielders in MLS. His first season in MLS finished with 14 regular season starts, contributing two assists, and ultimately resulting in the Union's first trophy, the 2020 Supporters' Shield. In January 2021, Martinez signed a new contract with the Union through the 2022 season, with options for the 2023 and 2024 seasons.

International career
Martinez received his first official call up to the Venezuela national team in October 2020. He represented the senior Venezuela national team in a 3–1 2022 FIFA World Cup qualification loss to Bolivia on 3 June 2021.

Career statistics

Club

Notes

Honours 
Zulia FC
Copa Venezuela: 2018

Philadelphia Union
Supporters' Shield: 2020

References

External links

1994 births
Living people
Venezuelan footballers
Venezuela international footballers
Venezuelan expatriate footballers
Deportivo JBL del Zulia players
Zulia F.C. players
Philadelphia Union players
Sportspeople from Maracaibo
Association football midfielders
Venezuelan expatriate sportspeople in the United States
Expatriate soccer players in the United States
Major League Soccer players
2021 Copa América players